The FINA Women's Water Polo World Cup is an international water polo competition contested by women's national water polo teams of the members of FINA, the aquatic sports' global governing body. The tournament was established in 1979 with an erratic schedule, was contested every two years from 1989 - 1999, and has been contested every four years since 2002.

From 2023 on, the tournament will be replacing the FINA Water Polo World League.

Results

Medal table

Participation details
Legend

  – Champions
  – Runners-up
  – Third place
  – Fourth place
  – Hosts
 Q – Qualified for forthcoming tournament
 † – Defunct team

See also
 FINA Water Polo World Cup
 List of water polo world medalists
 Major achievements in water polo by nation

References

 
Water polo
Water polo
Cup, Women's
Women's water polo competitions
World cups
Quadrennial sporting events